General Torrens may refer to:

Arthur Wellesley Torrens (1809–1855), British Army major general
Henry Torrens (1833–1889), British Army lieutenant general
Henry Torrens (British Army officer)  (1779–1828), British Army major general